Ontario International Airport  is an international airport two miles east of downtown Ontario, in San Bernardino County, California, United States, about  east of downtown Los Angeles and  west of downtown San Bernardino. It is owned and operated under a joint-powers agreement with the city of Ontario and San Bernardino County.

It is the West Coast air and truck hub for UPS Airlines and is a major distribution point for FedEx Express. , ONT has more than 64 daily departures and arrivals. Since Ontario's longest runway (runway 8L/26R) is longer than three of the four runways at Los Angeles International Airport (LAX), it is an alternate landing site for large aircraft destined for LAX.

History

Origins
In 1923, a landing field was established east of Central Avenue ( west of the current airport) on land leased from the Union Pacific Railroad. The airfield was named Latimer Field after an orange-packing company next to the airstrip. An airport was built there by one of the first flying clubs in Southern California, the Friends of Ontario Airport.

In 1941, the city bought  around the airport and approved construction of new runways, which were completed by 1942, with funds from the Works Progress Administration. On 27 February 1942, an Army Air Corps plane made the first landing at the new airport. By 1943, the airport was an Army Air Corps Lockheed P-38 Lightning training base and North American P-51 Mustang operating base.

After the war, it was one of the five large storage, sales, and scrapping centers for Army Air Forces aircraft established by the Reconstruction Finance Corporation; others were at Albuquerque AAF, New Mexico; Altus AAF, Oklahoma; Kingman AAF, Arizona; and  Walnut Ridge AAF, Arkansas.

Ontario International Airport

In 1946, Ontario Municipal Airport was renamed "Ontario International Airport" because of the trans-Pacific cargo flights originating there. On 17 May 1946, two Army surplus steel hangars arrived at the airport, which the Ontario city council had authorized the $50,000 purchase of just the previous week. City officials were pleased to have secured a bargain. Thought to be the only pair available in the U.S., City Manager Harold J. Martin observed that even if they could be acquired at a later date, the cost would be several times that afforded by prompt action. A Pacific Overseas Airlines flight from Shanghai arrived at Ontario on 18 May 1946, "which inaugurated regular round-trip air passenger air service between the United States and the Orient."  In 1949, Western Airlines began scheduled flights; in 1955, Bonanza Air Lines flights started. Western and Bonanza nonstops did not reach beyond Las Vegas. In 1962, Western began nonstop flights to San Francisco (one Electra daily). In 1967, Bonanza began nonstop F27 flights to Phoenix.

Ontario and Los Angeles entered into a joint-powers agreement, making Ontario International Airport part of the Los Angeles regional airports system in 1967. In 1968, the airport had its first scheduled jet flights. In 1969, Continental Airlines started Boeing 720B nonstops to Denver and Chicago; Air California started Boeing 737 flights to San Jose; Pacific Southwest Airlines started San Francisco flights; and Western began 737 nonstops to Sacramento and Salt Lake City. In 1970, United Airlines started a nonstop to Chicago and American started flights to Dallas (and Chicago, for a short time). In September 1986, Ontario hosted the Concorde supersonic airliner during a promotional round-the-world flight.

In 1981, a second east–west runway, 26L/8R, was built, necessitating the removal of the old NE-SW runway 4/22.  Remnants of the 4/22 runway are visible in the present-day taxiways. With the completion of the new runway, the existing runway 25/7 became 26R/8L. In 1985, the city of Los Angeles acquired Ontario International Airport outright from the city of Ontario. In 1987, Runway 26R/8L was extended to the east to bring the two runway thresholds side by side, so aircraft would be higher over neighborhoods. 26R/8L became the main departing runway and 26L/8R the main arrival runway.

For a number of years, the airport operated alongside Ontario Air National Guard Station, which was closed as a result of the 1995 Base Realignment and Closure Commission.

In 1998, the new and larger airport terminal opened, designed by DMJM Aviation. Two older terminals, west of the current terminal, the main terminal and a small terminal were discontinued when the new Terminal 2 and Terminal 4 facilities were opened. The old terminals currently house the administration and the USO.

In 2005 and 2006, runway 26R/8L was repaved and strengthened, and received storm drains and better runway lighting, and additional improvements to taxiway intersections were made.

In 2006, Ontario International Airport became "LA/Ontario International Airport." The "LA" portion was added to remind fliers of Los Angeles and to avoid confusion with the province of Ontario in Canada.

The airport's traffic peaked in 2005 with 7.2 million passengers, and remained steady through 2007. Around the time of the 2008 financial crisis, JetBlue suspended service to ONT, and major legacy carriers significantly decreased their passenger volume at the airport. Southwest Airlines transferred a significant portion of its Ontario capacity to Los Angeles International Airport (LAX), making LAX fares more competitive with ONT, while being coupled with more attractive frequencies and a wider range of destinations. The surrounding Inland Empire region was hit hard by the financial crisis, with the nearby city of San Bernardino declaring bankruptcy. The airport suffered a 40% decline in traffic between 2007 and 2012, during which time traffic at LAX recovered to surpass prerecession levels.

Ontario International Airport Authority
Ownership and control of the airport became an issue in late 2010, when the city of Ontario, supported by the Southern California Association of Governments, criticized and questioned LAWA's operation of the airport. A group of local government officials, led by Ontario city council member Alan Wapner, began a campaign to transfer control of the airport away from Los Angeles World Airports. Wapner argued that the City of Los Angeles had no interest in maintaining service at an airport well beyond its borders. In 2013, LAWA offered to return the airport to local control for a purchase price of $474M, which was rejected. Local groups then sued the city of Los Angeles, a suit that was temporarily suspended when both sides agreed to attempt to work together.

In 2015, Los Angeles World Airports tentatively agreed to turn over ownership of Ontario Airport to the city of Ontario. LAWA was "to be reimbursed for its investments in the facility, job protection for the facility's 182 employees and the settlement of a lawsuit in which Ontario sought to regain control of the airport. Once ownership is transferred, the airport will be operated by the Ontario International Airport Authority, formed under a joint-powers agreement between the city of Ontario and San Bernardino County." The Ontario International Airport Authority took over control of operations in November 2016, and the airport's operating name was reverted to Ontario International Airport, since the City of Los Angeles no longer oversaw operations of the airport.

The airport's continuing traffic decline reversed in early 2017, when the airport experienced faster growth than LAX for the first time since 2007. On September 30, 2017, it was announced that China Airlines would begin nonstop flights from Ontario to Taipei, which started in spring 2018.

Facilities

Terminals
Ontario International Airport has two terminals with 26 gates and a separate adjacent international arrivals facility with 2 arrival-only gates, totaling 28 gates.
 
Terminal 2 has  and 12 gates. Alaska Airlines, Avianca El Salvador, China Airlines, Delta Air Lines, Frontier Airlines, JetBlue, United Airlines, and Volaris are located in Terminal 2.

Terminal 4 has  and 14 gates. American Airlines, Hawaiian Airlines, and Southwest Airlines are located in Terminal 4.

The international arrivals facility has two gates for arrivals only, containing the airport's U.S. Customs and Border Protection facility. International flights depart from the main terminals.

A USO is housed in the old terminal complex near the international arrivals facility.

Remote parking is located on the east end of the airport (moved from its former location at the west end). On the east end is a ground transportation center that consolidates the rental car companies in one central location. A  bus circles the airport and provides connections to each of the terminals, rental car and remote parking lots, and public transit stops.

General aviation is located at the south side of the airport, although most general-aviation pilots tend to use a number of nearby airports: Redlands Airport, Chino Airport, Brackett Field in La Verne, Cable Airport in Upland, or San Bernardino International Airport.

Ground transportation
Motorists can use the San Bernardino Freeway (Interstate 10), Ontario Freeway (Interstate 15), or the Pomona Freeway (State Route 60). 

Omnitrans, San Bernardino County's main public transportation agency, operates three routes near the airport. Route 380, also called ONT Connect, provides non-stop daily service every 35 to 60 minutes between the airport and Rancho Cucamonga station, where passengers can connect to Metrolink's San Bernardino Line, which operates daily with service to Los Angeles Union Station. Route 61 operates daily between Downtown Pomona station, the airport and Fontana station, Both routes 61 and 380 operate from stops located east of baggage claim at terminals 2 and 4. Route 81 operates Monday through Saturday on Haven Avenue which runs along the eastern edge of the airport between Chaffey College and Ontario–East station, where passengers can connect to Metrolink's Riverside Line, which operates during weekday peak periods.

Noise restrictions
Ontario has few noise restrictions/abatement rules, unlike other Southern California airports such as John Wayne Airport, Bob Hope Airport, Long Beach Airport, and San Diego International Airport, which all have very strict policies. The airport is allowed to operate 24/7, but during the hours of 10 pm to 7 am, all aircraft must arrive from the east on runway 26L or 26R and take off to the east on runway 8R or 8L, depending on ATC instruction. This procedure is known as "Contra-Flow" operations and applies to turbojet or turbofan aircraft.  This procedure is similar to the one employed by LAX, where all landings are conducted from the east and all takeoffs are to the west (known as "over-ocean" operations) between midnight and 6:30 am. Both of these procedures are employed as long as weather and/or construction activity permits. This is done in an effort to be better neighbors and minimize the noise impact to the surrounding communities as much as possible. Residents of cities west of the airport have complained of increased noise as a result of the airport's refusal to abide by noise abatement rules.

Airlines and destinations

Passenger

Cargo

Statistics

Top destinations

Airline market share

Annual traffic

Accidents and incidents
 On December 25, 1945, a USAAF Douglas C-47 was stolen by two non-pilot ground members. It crashed four miles east of the airport, killing both occupants.
 On March 31, 1971, Western Airlines Flight 366, a Boeing 720 on a training flight, crashed on approach to Ontario during a three-engine ILS approach in limited visibility due to a loss of left rudder control. All five occupants on board were killed.
 On January 9, 1975, Golden West Airlines Flight 261, a De Havilland Twin Otter DHC-6 en route to Los Angeles collided with a Cessna 150 near Whittier. Four crew and twelve passengers on the two aircraft were killed.

References

External links

Official Ontario International Airport website
Ontario International Airport Master Plan
openNav: ONT / KONT charts
Weikel, Dan. "Los Angeles Times: "As use dwindles, calls grow for local control of Ontario airport" — 31 October 2011 article

Airports in San Bernardino County, California
Ontario, California
Airports established in 1929
1929 establishments in California
Proposed California High-Speed Rail stations
Reconstruction Finance Corporation disposal facilities
World War II airfields in the United States
Post-World War II aircraft storage facilities